Mihai Iulian Stancu (born 29 January 1996) is a Romanian professional footballer who plays as a defender or defensive midfielder for CSM Alexandria. In his career, Stancu also played for teams such as: FC Argeș Pitești, Fortuna Poiana Câmpina, Gaz Metan Mediaș and FC Hermannstadt.

Honours
Gaz Metan Mediaș
Liga II: 2015–16

Hermannstadt
Cupa României: Runner-up 2017–18

References

External links
 
 
 

1996 births
Living people
Sportspeople from Pitești
Romanian footballers
Association football defenders
Association football midfielders
Liga I players
CS Gaz Metan Mediaș players
Liga II players
FC Argeș Pitești players
FC Hermannstadt players
ASC Daco-Getica București players
Liga III players
CSM Focșani players